Raphaël Gauvain (born 10 April 1973) is a French lawyer and politician of La République En Marche! (LREM) who has been serving as a member of the French National Assembly since the 2017 elections, representing the department of Saône-et-Loire.

Political career
In parliament, Gauvain serves on the Committee on Legal Affairs. In this capacity, he served as rapporteur on a 2017 anti-terrorism law, a 2018 business secrecy law, and a 2021 anti-corruption law.

Political positions
In July 2019, Gauvain voted in favor of the French ratification of the European Union’s Comprehensive Economic and Trade Agreement (CETA) with Canada.

See also
 2017 French legislative election

References

1973 births
Living people
Deputies of the 15th National Assembly of the French Fifth Republic
La République En Marche! politicians
Place of birth missing (living people)